Asona may refer to:
Asona, one of the eight Akan Clans
Asona Town, A town in the Eastern Region of Ghana